Monaco competed at the 1960 Summer Olympics in Rome, Italy.  The nation returned to the Olympic Games after missing the 1956 Summer Olympics. Eleven competitors, all men, took part in six events in three sports.

Fencing

Two fencers represented Monaco in 1960.

Men's foil
 Gilbert Orengo
 Henri Bini

Men's épée
 Gilbert Orengo
 Henri Bini

Sailing

Shooting

Six shooters represented Monaco in 1960.

50 m rifle, three positions
 Gilbert Scorsoglio
 Francis Boisson

50 m rifle, prone
 Pierre Marsan
 Michel Ravarino

Trap
 Francis Bonafede
 Marcel Rué

References

External links
Official Olympic Reports

Nations at the 1960 Summer Olympics
1960
1960 in Monégasque sport